A general election was held in the U.S. state of Colorado on November 8, 2022. All of Colorado's executive officers were up for election, as well as all of Colorado's seats in the United States House of Representatives, and Colorado's U.S. Senate seat currently occupied by Michael Bennet.

The Colorado Democratic Party had a very successful election, sweeping every single statewide race by a double-digit margin. The party easily maintained control of the state’s Class 3 U.S. Senate seat and all state executive offices, including the governorship. Democrats  expanded their supermajorities in both chambers of the general assembly and won five of eight U.S. House districts (including winning the newly drawn 8th district in an upset, and nearly flipping the Republican-leaning 3rd district in an unexpectedly close result). 

The lopsided results were described by many as a “blue wave”, with one Republican strategist labeling it an "utter annihilation". After unexpectedly losing his own race, Republican state representative Colin Larson lamented that “Colorado Republicans need to take this and learn the lesson that the party is dead. This was an extinction-level event.”

United States Senate election

Democratic incumbent Michael Bennet was re-elected to a third term full term against Republican Joe O'Dea. Bennet won with 55.9% of the vote.

U.S. House of Representatives

Congressional District 1 
Incumbent Democrat Diana DeGette won re-election against Republican Jennifer Qualteri. DeGette was re-elected with 80.3% of the vote.

Congressional District 2 
Incumbent Democrat Joe Neguse won re-election against Republican Marshall Dawson. Neguse was re-elected with 70.0% of the vote.

Congressional District 3 
Incumbent Republican Lauren Boebert won re-election against Democrat Adam Frisch. Boebert was re-elected with 50.1% of the vote.

Congressional District 4 
Incumbent Republican Ken Buck won re-election against Democrat Ike McCorkle. Buck was re-elected with 60.9% of the vote.

Congressional District 5 
Incumbent Republican Doug Lamborn won re-election against Democrat David Torres. Lamborn was re-elected with 56.0% of the vote.

Congressional District 6 
Incumbent Democrat Jason Crow won re-election against Republican Steven Monahan. Crow was re-elected with 60.6% of the vote.

Congressional District 7 
Incumbent Democrat Ed Perlmutter retired. Democrat Brittany Pettersen defeated Republican Erik Aadland. Pettersen was elected with 56.4% of the vote.

Congressional District 8 
Colorado gained a congressional district after the 2020 Census. Democrat Yadira Caraveo defeated Republican Barbara Kirkmeyer. Caraveo was elected with 48.4% of the vote to Kirkmeyer's 47.7%.

Governor and lieutenant governor
Democratic incumbent Jared Polis was re-elected to a second term against Republican Heidi Ganahl. Polis won with 58.5% of the vote.

Attorney General
Incumbent Democrat Phil Weiser won re-election against Republican John Kellner. Weiser was re-elected with 54.7% of the vote.

Secretary of State
Incumbent Democrat Jena Griswold won re-election against Republican Pam Anderson. Griswold was re-elected with 55.1% of the vote.

Treasurer
Incumbent Democrat Dave Young won re-election against Republican Lang Sias. Young was re-elected with 53.7% of the vote.

State Board of Education

Congressional District 5
Incumbent Republican Steve Durham won re-election against Democrat Joseph Shelton. Durham was re-elected with 58.39% of the vote.

Congressional District 6
Incumbent Democrat Rebecca McClellan won re-election against Republican Molly Lamar. McClellan was re-elected with 58.28% of the vote.

Congressional District 8 
The creation of a new congressional district created a new seat on the State Board of Education. Democrat Rhonda Solis defeated Republican Peggy Propst. Solis was elected with 49.28% of the vote to Propst's 48.46%.

At-Large
During periods in which there are an even number of congressional districts (such as there will be for the 2022 election), the Colorado State Board of Education features an at-large member in order to retain an odd number of members and avoid ties. During the period in which there were six congressional districts, current governor Jared Polis most recently held this position.

Democrat Kathy Plomer defeated Republican Dan Maloit with 53.43% of the vote.

CU Regent

Congressional District 1
Incumbent Democrat Jack Kroll did not run for re-election. Democrat Wanda James defeated Republican Amy Naes with 78.61% of the vote.

Congressional District 4
Incumbent Sue Sharkey is term limited and ineligible to run for re-election. Republican Frank McNulty defeated Democrat Jack Barrington with 63.96% of the vote.

Congressional District 5 
Incumbent Republican Ken Montera defeated Democrat Ron Casados with 60.39% of the vote.

Congressional District 8
The creation of a new Congressional district created a new seat on the Board of CU Regents. Because there must be nine members of the Board, one seat was eliminated to make room for the new one, the at-large seat currently held by Heidi Ganahl. 

Republican Mark VanDriel defeated Democrat Yolanda Ortega with 51.68% of the vote.

Colorado Ballot Measures

Amendments 
А 55% supermajority was required to pass amendments D, E, and F.

Propositions

References

 
Colorado